Calpurnius Piso may refer to:
 Gaius Calpurnius Piso (disambiguation)
 Gnaeus Calpurnius Piso (disambiguation)
 Lucius Calpurnius Piso (disambiguation)

See also

 
 Calpurnii Pisones
 Calpurnio Pisón, a Spanish comic artist.